Mohammed Sangare (born 28 December 1998) is a Liberian footballer who plays for English club Accrington Stanley as a midfielder.

Early and personal life
Sangare was born in Monrovia, Liberia, and moved to England at the age of 14. His younger brother, Faisu, was part of the Wolverhampton Wanderers under-23 setup.

Club career
Sangare has played club football in England for Accrington Stanley and Newcastle United. He was promoted to Newcastle's first-team in July 2019.

He returned to Accrington Stanley on loan in August 2020.

In May 2022, it was announced that Sangare would be released at the end of his contract. Later that month it was announced that he would return to Accrington Stanley when his Newcastle contract expires on 1 July.

International career
Sangare received his first call-up to the Liberia national team in August 2018, for upcoming 2019 Africa Cup of Nations qualification matches. He had to withdraw from the squad twice as he was awaiting his UK residence permit to be re-issued, meaning he was unable to travel. He was recalled by the Liberian senior national team in March 2019.

He made his debut for the Liberia national football team on 24 March 2019 in an Africa Cup of Nations qualifier against DR Congo, coming on as a 73rd-minute substitute for Allen Njie.

International goals
Scores and results list Liberia's goal tally first.

References

1998 births
Living people
Liberian footballers
Sportspeople from Monrovia
Association football midfielders
Accrington Stanley F.C. players
Newcastle United F.C. players
Liberia international footballers
Liberian expatriate footballers
Liberian expatriate sportspeople in England
Expatriate footballers in England
English Football League players